The M58 is a motorway passing through Merseyside and Lancashire, terminating in Greater Manchester. It is 12 miles (19.3 km) long and provides a link between the M6 motorway and the Metropolitan Borough of Sefton and hence on, via the A5036, to the Mersey docks in Liverpool and Birkenhead.

Route
Apart from the approaches to its terminal roundabouts, the motorway is three lanes throughout.  It starts at Switch Island in Merseyside and passes directly underneath the Merseyrail Northern Line. before striking out across open countryside and into Lancashire south of Maghull and Bickerstaffe.  It then curves south Easterly south of Skelmersdale before reaching the M6 at Orrell in the Metropolitan Borough of Wigan, Greater Manchester.

History
Since 1949 an upgrade of the Wigan to Ormskirk route had been proposed to improve traffic flows, yet with the decision in 1961 to develop Skelmersdale as a new town, the proposals were revised to provide a link to the M6 at one end and Liverpool at the other.

The first part of the road was opened in March 1968 as the Skelmersdale Regional Road between what is now junctions 4 and 5.  It was originally a two-lane single carriageway road that was upgraded to two-lane plus with hard shoulders in 1973.

The next stage was to connect this road to the M6 and construction on this part began in 1968 and it was opened to traffic in October 1970 as all purpose dual carriageway.  Now junctions 5 to 6, this road was upgraded to dual three lanes with a hard shoulder in 1977.  These roads were upgraded to motorway status in 1977.

Construction on Switch Island to junction 4 section began in 1978 with the road opening between April and September 1980.

Unfulfilled plans
Junction 2 was not built, and was the end of a proposed motorway to Preston.  This was originally given the designation A59(M) as an upgrade to the A59 and later referred to as the M59.  However these proposals were dropped in favour of improvements to the existing A59.

At Switch Island, the junction has been built to allow an extension of the M57  and the end of M58 has provision for slip roads to the extension to be constructed.

Lancashire County Council had in 1949 also proposed a Wigan to Bolton road. Bridges had been built on the M61 to allow for this eventual continuation.  Later plans saw the road downgraded to an A road; it would have reached the M61 between junctions 5 and 6.  These plans have also been dropped and currently Wigan Borough Council has plans for a part dual and part single carriageway route to the A579 near Atherton.

Junctions

Data from driver location signs are used to provide  distance information.
{| class="plainrowheaders wikitable"
|-
!scope=col|Ceremonialcounty
!scope=col|Location
!scope=col|mi
!scope=col|km
!scope=col|Junction
!scope=col|Destinations
!scope=col|Notes
|-
| rowspan="2" |Merseyside
|Liverpool
|0
|0
|M57 J7
| – Kirkby, Widnes
 – Southport, Ormskirk
 – Bootle
 – Southport, Formby
|
|-
| rowspan="2" |— 
|2.2
|3.6
|1
| – Kirkby, Maghull
|
|-
| rowspan="3" |Lancashire
|6.0
|9.6
|3
| – St Helens, Ormskirk, Southport
|
|-
| rowspan="2" |Skelmersdale
|7.7
|12.3
|4
| – Skelmersdale 
|
|-
|9.4
|15.1
|5
| – Skelmersdale, Pimbo, Upholland
|
|-
|Greater Manchester
|Wigan 
|11.6
|18.7
|6
| – Preston, The South, Manchester, Birmingham
 – Wigan 
|

Coordinate list

See also
List of motorways in the United Kingdom

References

External links

Motorway Database – M58
Lancashire County Council – Historic Highways – M58
The Motorway Archive – M58

Motorways in England
Roads in Lancashire
Roads in Greater Manchester
Roads in Merseyside